The following is a list of psychedelic drugs of various chemical classes, including both naturally occurring and synthetic compounds. Serotonergic psychedelics are usually considered the "classical" psychedelics, whereas the other classes are often seen as having only secondary psychedelic properties; nonetheless all of the compounds listed here are considered psychoactive and hallucinogenic in humans to some degree.

Some of these compounds may be classified differently or under more than one category due to a unique structural classification, multiple mechanisms of action, or the fact that the precise pharmacodynamic actions of the compound are not yet completely understood. Because of the vast amount of possible substitutions and chemical analogs of most psychedelic compounds, the total diversity of chemical compounds which produce psychedelic effects in humans is not fully reflected within this list, leaving room for many that have not yet been sufficiently investigated and others that have not yet been discovered.

Naturally occurring compounds are marked with a †.

Serotonergic psychedelics (serotonin 5-HT2A receptor agonists)
 Indoles
Tryptamines (more specifically alkylated tryptamines])
 Psilocin†, also known as '4-HO-DMT'; another active constituent of the Psilocybe genus of mushrooms; also a metabolite of psilocybin and psilacetin
 Psilocybin†, also known as '4-PO-DMT'; the primary active constituent of the Psilocybe genus of mushrooms; its effects are partially attributed to psilocin, to which it is a prodrug via dephosphorylation
 Bufotenin†, also known as '5-HO-DMT' and dimethylserotonin; another constituent of the skin and venom of psychoactive toads, its psychedelic activity is disputed; also a metabolite of 5-MeO-DMT
 Baeocystin†, also known as '4-PO-NMT'; another active constituent of the Psilocybe genus of mushrooms; its psychedelic activity is disputed
 Aeruginascin†, also known as '4-PO-N-TMT', an active constituent of the mushroom Inocybe aeruginascens
 5-MeO-DMT†, the primary active constituent of the skin and venom of psychoactive toads, a prodrug to bufotenin via demethylation
 N,N-Dimethyltryptamine†, also known as 'DMT'; the primary active constituent of the Amerindian brew ayahuasca; endogenously present in various plants and animals, including humans, possibly a trace amine neurotransmitter
 5-Bromo-DMT†, was found in the marine invertebrates Smenospongia aurea and Smenospongia echina, as well as in Verongula rigida
 N-Methyl-N-ethyltryptamine, also known as 'MET'
 N-Methyl-N-isopropyltryptamine, also known as 'MiPT'
 N-Methyl-N-propyltryptamine, also known as 'MPT'
 N,N-Diethyltryptamine, also known as 'DET'
 N-Ethyl-N-isopropyltryptamine, also known as 'EiPT'
 N-Methyl-N-butyltryptamine, also known as 'MBT'
 N-Propyl-N-isopropyltryptamine, also known as 'PiPT'
 N,N-Dipropyltryptamine, also known as 'DPT'
 N,N-Diisopropyltryptamine, also known as 'DiPT'
 N,N-Diallyltryptamine, also known as 'DALT'
 N,N-Dibutyltryptamine, also known as 'DBT'
 N-Ethyltryptamine, also known as 'NET'
 N-Methyltryptamine†, also known as 'NMT'; its psychedelic activity is disputed
 Trimethyltryptamine, also known as 'TMT' (2,N,N-TMT, 5,N,N-TMT, and 7,N,N-TMT)
 α-Methyltryptamine, also known as 'αMT' and 'AMT'; also has entactogenic properties
 α-Ethyltryptamine, also known as 'αET' and 'AET'; also has entactogenic properties
 α,N-DMT
 α,N,N-Trimethyltryptamine, also known as 'α-TMT'
 Ethocybin, also known as '4-PO-DET', 'CEY-19', and 'CEY-39'
 4-HO-MET, also known as 'Metocin', 'Methylcybin', and 'Colour'
 4-HO-DET, also known as 'Ethocin' and 'CZ-74'
 4-HO-MPT, also known as 'Meprocin'
 4-HO-MiPT, also known as 'Miprocin'
 4-HO-MALT
 4-HO-DPT, also known as 'Deprocin'
 4-HO-DiPT, also known as 'Iprocin'
 4-HO-DALT, also known as 'Daltocin'
 4-HO-DBT
 4-HO-DSBT
 4-HO-αMT
 4-HO-MPMI, also known as 'Lucigenol'
 4-HO-TMT
 4-HO-1,N,N-TMT, also known as '1-Me-4-HO-DMT' and '1-methylpsilocin'
 4-HO-5-MeO-DMT, also known as 'Psilomethoxin'
 4-AcO-DMT, also known as 'psiloacetin'; its effects are partially attributed to psilocin, to which it is a prodrug via deacetylation
 4-AcO-MET, also known as 'Metacetin'
 4-AcO-MiPT
 4-AcO-MALT
 4-AcO-DET, also known as 'Ethacetin'
 4-AcO-EiPT, also known as 'Ethipracetin'
 4-AcO-DPT, also known as 'Depracetin'
 4-AcO-DiPT, also known as 'Ipracetin'
 4-AcO-DALT, also known as 'Daltacetin'
 4-MeO-DMT
 4-MeO-MiPT
 5-MeO-NMT†
 5-MeO-MET
 5-MeO-MPT
 5-MeO-MiPT, also known as 'Moxy'; also has entactogenic properties
 5-MeO-MALT
 5-MeO-DET
 5-MeO-EiPT
 5-MeO-EPT
 5-MeO-PiPT
 5-MeO-DPT
 5-MeO-DiPT, also known as 'Foxy Methoxy' 
 5-MeO-DALT
 5-MeO-αMT, also has entactogenic properties
 5-MeO-αET, also has entactogenic properties
 5-MeO-MPMI
 5-MeO-2,N,N-TMT , also known as 'Indomethacin' and 'Indapex'
 5-MeO-7,N,N-TMT
 5-MeO-a,N-DMT, also known as 'α,N,O-TMS'
 4-F-5-MeO-DMT
 5-MeS-DMT
 5-Me-MiPT, its psychedelic activity is disputed
 5-HO-DiPT
 2-α-DMT
 2-Me-DET
 4-Me-αMT
 4-Me-αET, also has entactogenic properties
 7-Me-αET, also has entactogenic properties
 4,5-DHP-AMT, also known as 'AL-37350A'
 4,5-DHP-DMT
 4,5-MDO-DMT
 4,5-MDO-DiPT
 5,6-MDO-DiPT
 5,6-MDO-MiPT
 5-Fluoro-αMT, also has entactogenic properties
 6-Fluoro-αMT
 6-Fluoro-DMT
 N,N-Tetramethylenetryptamine, also known as 'Pyr-T'
 4-HO-pyr-T
 5-MeO-pyr-T
 RU-28306, also known as '4,a-Methylene-N,N-DMT'
 O-4310, also known as '6-Fluoro-1-Isopropyl-4-HO-DMT'
 CP-132,484, also known as '4,5-DHP-1-Methyltryptamine'
 Benzofuran derivatives (technically not tryptamines)
 Dimemebfe, also known as '5-MeO-BFE'
 5-MeO-DiBF
 Ibogoids (can be classified as complex tryptamines)
 Ibogaine†, the primary active constituent of iboga rootbark; also has dissociative properties
 Voacangine†, another active constituent of iboga rootbark
 Ergolines (more specifically lysergamides, which can be classified as complex tryptamines; also contain a phenethylamine backbone)
Lysergic acid diethylamide, also known as 'LSD' and 'acid'
 Lysergic acid amide†, also known as 'LSA' and 'ergine'; the primary active constituent of morning glory and Hawaiian baby woodrose seeds
 N1-Methyl-lysergic acid diethylamide, also known as 'MLD-41'
 N-Acetyl-lysergic acid diethylamide, also known as 'ALD-52'
 1-Propionyl-lysergic acid diethylamide, also known as '1P-LSD'; its effects are partially attributed to LSD, to which it is a prodrug via hydrolyzation
 1‐cyclopropanoyl‐d‐lysergic acid diethylamide, also known as '1cP-LSD'
1-valeryl-D-lysergic acid diethylamide, also known as '1V-LSD'
6-Allyl-6-nor-lysergic acid diethylamide, also known as 'AL-LAD'
6-Butyl-6-nor-lysergic acid diethylamide, also known as 'BU-LAD'
6-Ethyl-6-nor-lysergic acid diethylamide, also known as 'ETH-LAD'
1-Propionyl-6-Ethyl-6-nor-lysergic acid diethylamide, also known as '1P-ETH-LAD'
6-Propyl-6-nor-lysergic acid diethylamide, also known as 'PRO-LAD'
6-Cyclopropyl-6-nor-lysergic acid diethylamide, also known as 'CYP-LAD'
6-nor-Lysergic acid diethylamide, also known as 'PARGY-LAD'
Lysergic acid ethylamide, also known as 'LAE-32'
Lysergic acid α-hydroxyethylamide†, also known as 'LSH' and 'LAH'; another active constituent of morning glory seeds; an active constituent of some species of fungi
Lysergic acid 2-butyl amide, also known as 'LSB'
Lysergic acid 3-pentyl amide, also known as 'LSP'
Lysergic acid methyl ester, also known as 'LSME'
Lysergic acid 2,4-dimethylazetidide, also known as 'LSZ' and 'LA-SS-Az'
Lysergic acid piperidine, also known as 'LSD-Pip'; its psychedelic activity is disputed
N,N-Dimethyl-lysergamide, also known as 'DAM-57'
Methylisopropyllysergamide, also known as 'MIPLA'
N,N-Diallyllysergamide, also known as 'DAL'
N-Pyrrolidyllysergamide, also known as 'LPD-824'
N-Morpholinyllysergamide, also known as 'LSM-775'
1-methyl-lysergic acid butanolamide, also known as 'Methysergide'; the active constituent of Sansert and Deseril; a prodrug which has to be metabolized to methylergometrine to become psychoactive
Lysergic acid β-propanolamide†, also known as 'Ergonovine' and 'Ergometrine'; another active constituent of morning glory seeds, and an active constituent of ergot fungi
Lysergic acid 1-butanolamide†, also known as 'Methylergonovine', 'Methergine', and 'Methylergometrine'; another active constituent of morning glory seeds and of ergot fungi
 Phenethylamines (more specifically alkoxylated phenethylamines)
 Substituted phenethylamines
 Mescaline†, the primary active constituent of certain cacti, such as peyote and San Pedro
 Lophophine†, also known as 'MMDPEA'; another active constituent of certain cacti, such as peyote and San Pedro; also has entactogenic properties
 Isomescaline
 Cyclopropylmescaline
 Thioisomescaline (2-TIM, 3-TIM, and 4-TIM)
 4-Desoxymescaline
 Jimscaline
 Escaline
 Metaescaline
 Thiometaescaline (3-TME, 4-TME, and 5-TME)
 Trisescaline
 Thiotrisescaline (3-T-TRIS and 4-T-TRIS)
 Symbescaline
 Asymbescaline
 Thiosymbescaline (3-TSB and 4-TSB)
 Phenescaline
 Allylescaline, also known as 'AL'
 Methallylescaline
 Proscaline
 Isoproscaline
 Metaproscaline
 Thioproscaline
 Buscaline
 Thiobuscaline
 α-ethylmescaline, also known as 'AEM'
 Ariadne, also known as 'α-Et-DOM', '4C-D', and 'Dimoxamine'
 Macromerine
 MEPEA
 TOM (2-TOM and 5-TOM)
 Bis-TOM
 TOMSO, also known as '2-methoxy-4-methyl-5-methylsulfinylamphetamine'
 TOET (2-TOET and 5-TOET)
 BOH
 BOM, also known as 'β-Methoxy-mescaline'
 β-D
 4-D
 DME
 F-2
 F-22
 FLEA, also known as 'MDHMA'
 MDPH
 MDMP
 Propynyl
 2C family (2,5-dimethoxy, 4-substituted phenethylamines)
 βk-2C-B
 2C-B
 2CB-2EtO
 2CB-5EtO
 2CB-diEtO
 2C-B-FLY
 2C-B-BUTTERFLY
 2C-C
 2C-D
 2CD-2EtO
 2CD-diEtO
 2CD-5EtO
 2C-E
 2C-EF
 2C-F
 2C-G (2C-G-1, 2C-G-2, 2C-G-3, 2C-G-4, 2C-G-5, 2C-G-6, and 2C-G-N)
 2C-H
 2C-I
 2CI-2EtO
 2C-iP
 2C-N
 2C-O
 2C-O-4
 2C-P
 2C-SE
 2C-T
 2CT-5EtO
 2C-T-2
 2CT-2-2EtO
 2CT-2-5EtO
 2CT-2-diEtO
 2C-T-4 (2C-T-4 and Ψ-2C-T-4)
 2CT-4-2EtO
 2C-T-7
 2CT-7-2EtO
 2C-T-8
 2C-T-9
 2C-T-13
 2C-T-15
 2C-T-16
 2C-T-17
 2C-T-19, 
 2C-T-21
 2C-TFM
 2C-YN
 BOB, also known as 'β-Methoxy-2C-B'
 BOD, also known as 'β-Methoxy-2C-D'
 BOHD, also known as 'β-Hydroxy-2C-D'
 HOT-2
 HOT-7
 HOT-17
 Indane derivatives (technically not phenethylamines)
 2CB-Ind
 Benzocyclobutene derivatives (technically not phenethylamines)
 2C-BCB, also known as 'TCB-2'
 NBOMe derivatives
 NBOMe-mescaline
 2C-H-NBOMe, also known as '25H-NBOMe'
 2C-C-NBOMe, also known as '25C-NBOMe'
 2CBCB-NBOMe, also known as 'NBOMe-TCB-2'
 2CBFly-NBOMe, also known as 'Cimbi-31'
 2C-B-NBOMe, also known as '25B-NBOMe', 'M25B-NBOMe', 'BOM 2-CB', 'Cimbi-36', 'Nova', or 'New Nexus'
 2C-I-NBOMe, also known as '25I-NBOMe', 'Cimbi-5', "Solaris", or "N-Bomb"
 2C-TFM-NBOMe, also known as '25TFM-NBOMe'
 2C-D-NBOMe, also known as '25D-NBOMe'
 2C-G-NBOMe, also known as '25G-NBOMe'
 2C-E-NBOMe, also known as '25E-NBOMe'
 2C-P-NBOMe, also known as '25P-NBOMe'
 2C-iP-NBOMe, also known as '25iP-NBOMe'
 2C-CN-NBOMe, also known as '25CN-NBOMe'
 2C-N-NBOMe, also known as '25N-NBOMe'
 2C-T-NBOMe, also known as '25T2-NBOMe'
 2C-T-4-NBOMe, also known as '25T4-NBOMe'
 2C-T-7-NBOMe, also known as '25T7-NBOMe'
 DMBMPP, 2-Benzylpiperidine analogue of 25B-NBOMe
 NBOH derivatives
 2C-C-NBOH, also known as '25C-NBOH' and 'NBOH-2CC'
 2C-B-NBOH, also known as '25B-NBOH'
 2C-I-NBOH, also known as '25I-NBOH'
 2C-CN-NBOH, also known as '25CN-NBOH' and 'NBOH-2C-CN' 
 NBMD derivatives
 2C-I-NBMD, also known as '25I-NBMD'
 NBF derivatives
 2C-C-NBF, also known as '25C-NBF'
 2C-B-NBF, also known as '25B-NBF'
 2C-I-NBF, also known as '25I-NBF'
 Substituted amphetamines (alpha-methyl-phenethylamines)
 3C family (3,5-dimethoxy, 4-substituted amphetamines)
 3C-E
 3C-P
 3C-DFE
 3C-BZ
 DOx family (2,5-dimethoxy, 4-substituted amphetamines)
 DOAM
 DOB
 Meta-DOB
 Methyl-DOB
 DOBU
 DOC
 DOEF
 DOET, also known as 'DOE'
 DOI
 DOM, also known as 'STP'
 Ψ-DOM
 DON
 DOPR
 DOiPR
 DOT, also known as 'Aleph' (Aleph-2, Aleph-4, Aleph-6, and Aleph-7)
 Meta-DOT
 Ortho-DOT
 DOTFM
 Phenylcyclopropylamine derivatives (technically not amphetamines)
 DMCPA
 DMMDA
 DMMDA-2
 2,5-dimethoxy-3,4-dimethylamphetamine, also known as 'Ganesha'; (G-3, G-4, G-5, and G-N)
 4-methyl-2,5-dimethoxymethamphetamine, also known as 'Beatrice', 'MDO-D', and 'MDOM'
 2,N-dimethyl-4,5-methylenedioxyamphetamine, also known as 'Madam-6'
 Dimethoxyamphetamine (2,4-DMA, 2,5-DMA, and 3,4-DMA)
 Trimethoxyamphetamine (TMA-2, TMA-6)
 Tetramethoxyamphetamine
 Br-DragonFLY
 TFMFly
 2-Bromo-4,5-methylenedioxyamphetamine
 4-Bromo-3,5-dimethoxyamphetamine
 EEE
 EEM
 EME
 EMM
 EDMA
 EIDA
 Ethyl-J, also known as 'EBDB'
 Methyl-J, also known as 'MDMB'
 Ethyl-K, also known as 'EBDP'
 Methyl-K, also known as 'MBDP' and 'UWA-91'
 IDNNA
 Iris
 MDAI
 MDMAI
 MDAT
 MDMAT
 MDAL
 MDBU
 MDBZ
 MDDM
 MDIP
 MDMEOET
 MDMEO
 MDOH, also known as 'MDH'
 MDHOET
 MDPL
 MDCPM
 MDPR
 MEDA
 MEM
 Methyl-DMA
 MMDA, also known as '3-methoxy-MDA' (2T-MMDA-3a and 4T-MMDA-2)
 MMDA-2
 5-Methyl-MDA
 MEE
 MME
 MPM
 DiFMDA
 5-APB
 6-APB, also known as 'Benzofury' 
 5-APDB
 6-APDB
 5-MAPB
 5-MAPDB
 6-MAPDB, its psychedelic activity is disputed
 6-MAPB
 6-EAPB
 5-EAPB
 Para-Methoxyamphetamine, also known as 'PMA' and '4-MA' 
 Paramethoxymethamphetamine, also known as 'PMMA', 'Methyl-MA', and '4-MMA' 
 4-Ethylamphetamine, also known as '4-EA'
 3-Methoxy-4-methylamphetamine, also known as 'MMA'
 4-Methylmethamphetamine, also known as '4-MMA'
 4-Methylthioamphetamine, also known as '4-MTA'
 4-Fluoroamphetamine, also known as '4-FA', 'PAL-303', 'Flux', 'Flits', 'R2D2', and 'Miley' 
 Norfenfluramine, also known as '3-TFMA'
 Para-Iodoamphetamine, also known as 'PIA', '4-iodoamphetamine', and '4-IA' 
 Para-Chloroamphetamine, also known as 'PCA', '4-chloroamphetamine', and '4-CA' 
 Benzoxazines (more specifically cyclopropylethynylated benzoxazines)
 Substituted benzoxazines
 Efavirenz, the active constituent of Sustiva, Stocrin, and Efavir

Empathogens/entactogens (serotonin (5-HT) releasing agents)
 Substituted methylenedioxy-phenethylamines (MDxx)
 MDMA, also known as 'Molly', and 'Mandy' 
 MDA, also known as 'Sass' 
 2,3-MDA, also known as 'ORTHO-MDA'
 5-Methyl-MDA
 MMDA, also known as '3-methoxy-MDA'
 MDEA, also known as 'MDE'
 MBDB
 MDAL
 MDBU
 MDBZ
 MDDM
 MDIP
 MDMEOET
 MDMEO
 MDOH, also known as 'MDH'
 MDHOET
 MDPL
 MDCPM
 MDPR
 BDB, also known as 'MDB' and 'J'
 MMDA-2
 DiFMDA
 EIDA
 Ethyl-K, also known as 'EBDP'
 Lophophine†, also known as 'MMDPEA'; an active constituent of certain cacti, such as peyote and San Pedro
 Substituted amphetamines (exclusively; most of the substituted methylenedioxy-phenethylamines also overlap this category)
 EDMA
 Para-Methoxyamphetamine, also known as 'PMA'
 Paramethoxymethamphetamine, also known as 'PMMA' and 'Methyl-MA' 
 4-Ethylamphetamine, also known as '4-EA'
 3-Methoxy-4-methylamphetamine, also known as 'MMA'
 4-Methylmethamphetamine, also known as '4-MMA'
 4-Methylthioamphetamine, also known as '4-MTA'
 4-Fluoroamphetamine, also known as '4-FA', 'PAL-303', 'Flux', 'Flits', 'R2D2', and 'Miley' 
 Norfenfluramine, also known as '3-TFMA'
 Para-Iodoamphetamine, also known as 'PIA', '4-iodoamphetamine', and '4-IA' 
 Para-Chloroamphetamine, also known as 'PCA', '4-chloroamphetamine', and '4-CA' 
 Substituted cathinones
 Methylone, also known as 'bk-MDMA' and 'MDMC' 
 Ethylone, also known as 'bk-MDEA' and 'MDEC' 
 Eutylone, also known as 'bk-EBDB'
 Butylone, also known as 'bk-MBDB'
 Pentylone, also known as 'bk-Methyl-K' and 'bk-MBDP' 
 4-Ethylmethcathinone, also known as '4-EMC'
 3-Methylmethcathinone, also known as '3-MMC'
 Substituted benzofurans
 5-APB
 6-APB
 5-APDB
 6-APDB
 5-MAPB
 5-MAPDB
 6-MAPDB, its psychedelic activity is disputed
 6-MAPB
 5-EAPB
 6-EAPB
 5-MBPB
 Substituted tetralins
 MDAT
 MDMAT
 6-CAT
 Tetralinylaminopropane, also known as 'TAP' and '6-APT' 
 Substituted indanes
 Trifluoromethylaminoindane, also known as 'TAI'
 Ethyltrifluoromethylaminoindane, also known as 'ETAI'
 5-Iodo-2-aminoindane, also known as '5-IAI'
 MMAI
 MDAI
 MDMAI
 Indanylaminopropane, also known as '5-APDI' and 'IAP' 
 Substituted naphthalenes
 Naphthylaminopropane, also known as 'NAP' and 'PAL-287' 
 Substituted phenylisobutylamines (alpha-ethyl-phenethylamines)
 4-chlorophenylisobutylamine, also known as '4-chloro-α-ethylphenethylamine', '4-CAB', and 'AEPCA' 
 4-Methylphenylisobutylamine, also known as '4-MAB'
 Ariadne, also known as 'α-Et-DOM', '4C-D', and 'Dimoxamine'
 Alpha-substituted (-alkylated) tryptamines
 α-methyltryptamine, also known as 'αMT' and 'AMT'
 5-MeO-αMT
 α-ethyltryptamine, also known as 'αET' and 'AET'
 4-Me-αET
 7-Me-αET
 5-MeO-αET
 5-MeO-MiPT

Cannabinoids (CB-1 cannabinoid receptor ligands)
 Phytocannabinoids
Δ9-THC†, agonist; the primary active constituent of cannabis
11-hydroxy-Δ9-THC, agonist; an active metabolite of orally administered Δ9-THC; not technically a phytocannabinoid
 CBD†, negative allosteric modulator, another major active constituent of cannabis
 CBN†, a minor active constituent of cannabis, also a metabolite of THC and a product of its degradation
 THCV†, a minor active constituent of cannabis
 Synthetic cannabinoids
 (C6)-CP 47,497
 (C9)-CP 47,497
 1-Butyl-3-(2-methoxybenzoyl)indole
 1-Butyl-3-(4-methoxybenzoyl)indole
 1-Pentyl-3-(2-methoxybenzoyl)indole
 2-Isopropyl-5-methyl-1-(2,6-dihydroxy-4-nonylphenyl)cyclohex-1-ene
 4-HTMPIPO
 4-Nonylphenylboronic acid
 5Br-UR-144
 5Cl-APINACA
 5Cl-UR-144
 5F-3-pyridinoylindole
 5F-AB-FUPPYCA
 5F-ADB-PINACA
 5F-ADBICA
 5F-ADB
 5F-AMB
 5F-APINACA
 5F-CUMYL-PINACA
 5F-EMB-PINACA
 5F-NNE1
 5F-PB-22
 5F-PCN
 5F-PY-PICA
 5F-PY-PINACA
 5F-SDB-006
 HHC
 A-796,260
 A-834,735
 A-836,339
 A-955,840
 A-40174
 A-41988
 A-42574
 AB-001
 AB-CHFUPYCA
 AB-CHMFUPPYCA
 AB-CHMINACA
 AB-FUBICA
 AB-FUBINACA 2-fluorobenzyl isomer
 AB-FUBINACA
 AB-PICA
 AB-PINACA
 Abnormal cannabidiol
 ADAMANTYL-THPINACA
 ADB-CHMINACA
 ADB-FUBICA
 ADB-FUBINACA
 ADB-PINACA
 ADBICA
 ADSB-FUB-187
 Ajulemic acid
 AM-087
 AM-411
 AM-630
 AM-630
 AM-679
 AM-694
 AM-855
 AM-883
 AM-905
 AM-906
 AM-919
 AM-926
 AM-938
 AM-1220
 AM-1221
 AM-1235
 AM-1241
 AM-1248
 AM-1346
 AM-1387
 AM-1714
 AM-2201
 AM-2232
 AM-2233
 AM-2389
 AM-4030
 AM-4113
 AM-6527
 AM-6545
 AM-251
 AM-281
 AM-404
 AMB-CHMINACA
 AMB-FUBINACA
 AMG-1
 AMG-3
 AMG-36
 AMG-41
 APICA
 APINACA, also known as 'AKB48'
 APP-FUBINACA
 Arachidonoyl serotonin
 ACEA
 ACPA
 Arvanil
 AZ-11713908
 BAY 38-7271
 BAY 59-3074
 BIM-018
 Biochanin A
 BML-190
 Nabidrox (Canbisol)
 Cannabicyclohexanol
 Cannabipiperidiethanone
 CAY-10401
 CAY-10429
 CAY-10508
 CB-13
 CB-25
 CB-52
 CB-86
 CB-86
 CBS-0550
 CP 47,497
 CP 55,244
 CP 55,940
 CUMYL-5F-PICA
 CUMYL-BICA
 CUMYL-PICA
 CUMYL-PINACA
 CUMYL-THPINACA
 Dexanabinol, also known as 'HU-211'
 Dimethylheptylpyran, also known as 'DMHP'
 Drinabant, also known as 'AVE1625'
 Dronabinol
 EAM-2201
 EMB-FUBINACA
 FAB-144
 FDU-NNE1
 FDU-PB-22
 FUB-144
 FUB-APINACA
 FUB-JWH-018
 FUB-PB-22
 FUBIMINA
 Genistein
 GW-405,833, also known as 'L-768,242'
 GW-842,166X
 Hemopressin
 HU-210
 HU-243
 HU-308
 HU-320
 HU-331
 HU-336
 HU-345
 HU-910
 Ibipinabant, also known as 'SLV319'
 IDFP
 JNJ 1661010
 JTE-907
 JTE 7-31
 JWH-007
 JWH-015
 JWH-018
 JWH-019
 JWH-030
 JWH-051
 JWH-073
 JWH-081
 JWH-098
 JWH-116
 JWH-122
 JWH-133
 JWH-139
 JWH-147
 JWH-149
 JWH-161
 JWH-164
 JWH-167
 JWH-175
 JWH-176
 JWH-182
 JWH-184
 JWH-185
 JWH-192
 JWH-193
 JWH-194
 JWH-195
 JWH-196
 JWH-197
 JWH-198
 JWH-199
 JWH-200
 JWH-203
 JWH-210
 JWH-229
 JWH-249
 JWH-250
 JWH-251
 JWH-302
 JWH-307
 JWH-359
 JWH-369
 JWH-370
 JWH-398
 JWH-424
 JZL184
 JZL195
 Kaempferol
 KM-233
 L-759,633
 L-759,656
 LASSBio-881
 LBP-1
 Leelamine
 Levonantradol, also known as 'CP 50,5561'
 LH-21
 LY-320,135
 LY-2183240
 MAM-2201
 MDA-7
 MDA-19
 MDA-77
 MDMB-CHMICA
 MDMB-CHMINACA
 MDMB-FUBINACA
 Menabitan
 MEPIRAPIM
 Methanandamide, also known as 'AM-356'
 MJ-15
 MK-9470
 MMB-2201
 MN-18
 MN-25, also known as 'UR-12'
 Nabazenil
 Nabilone
 Nabitan
 Naboctate
 NESS-0327
 NESS-040C5
 NIDA-41020
 NM-2201
 NMP-7
 NNE1
 Nonabine
 O-224
 O-581
 O-585
 O-606
 O-689
 O-774
 O-806
 O-823
 O-889
 O-1057
 O-1125
 O-1184
 O-1191
 O-1238
 O-1248
 O-1269
 O-1270
 O-1376
 O-1399
 O-1422
 O-1601
 O-1602
 O-1624
 O-1656
 O-1657
 O-1660
 O-1812
 O-1860
 O-1861
 O-1871
 O-1918
 O-2048
 O-2050
 O-2093
 O-2113
 O-2220
 O-2365
 O-2372
 O-2373
 O-2383
 O-2426
 O-2484
 O-2545
 O-2654
 O-2694
 O-2715
 O-2716
 O-3223
 O-3226
 Oleoylethanolamide, also known as 'OEA'
 Olvanil
 Org 27569
 Org 27759
 Org 28312
 Org 28611
 Org 29647
 Otenabant, also known as 'CP-945,598'
 Palmitoylethanolamide, also known as 'PEA'
 Parahexyl
 PF-03550096
 PF-04457845
 PF-622
 PF-750
 PF-3845
 PF-514273
 PHOP
 PipISB
 Pirnabine
 Pravadoline
 Pregnenolone
 PSB-SB-487
 PSB-SB-1202
 PTI-1
 PTI-2
 PX-1
 PX-2
 PX-3
 QUCHIC, also known as 'BB-22'
 QUPIC, also known as 'PB-22'
 RCS-4
 RCS-8
 Rimonabant, also known as 'SR141716'
 Rosonabant, also known as 'E-6776'
 RTI-371
 S-444,823
 SDB-006
 SER-601
 SPA-229
 SR-144,528
 STS-135
 Surinabant, also known as 'SR147778'
 Taranabant, also known as 'MK-0364'
 Tedalinab
 THC-O-acetate
 THC-O-phosphate
 THJ-018
 THJ-2201
 Tinabinol
 TM-38837
 UR-144
 URB-447
 URB-447
 URB-597
 URB-602
 URB-754
 VCHSR
 VDM-11
 VSN-16
 WIN 54,461
 WIN 55,212-2
 WIN 56,098
 XLR-11
 Yangonin

Other
 Harmaline†, harmala alkaloids†, and other beta-carbolines, active constituents of ayahuasca; powerful MAOIs (can be classified as indoles)
 Salvinorin A†, an opioid (κ-opioid receptor agonist), the active constituent of Salvia divinorum sage
 Salvinorin B methoxymethyl ether†, a semi-synthetic analogue of the natural product salvinorin A with longer duration and increased affinity and potency at the κ-opioid receptor
 Salvinorin B ethoxymethyl ether†, a semi-synthetic analogue of the natural product salvinorin A with longer duration and increased affinity and potency at the κ-opioid receptor
 Piperazines, such as pFPP and TFMPP, usually classified as stimulants
 Myristicin† and elemicin†, the active constituents of nutmeg
 Cryogenine (Vertine)†, the active constituent of certain Heimia species
 Atropine†, scopolamine†, and hyoscyamine†, the active constituents of certain Solanaceae species
 Ibotenic acid† and muscimol†, the active constituents of Amanita muscaria mushrooms

See also
 List of entheogens
 List of designer drugs
 Psychedelic plants
 PiHKAL
 TiHKAL

References

.
Psychedelic drugs